Eva Lindsten (born 31 May 1945) is a Swedish equestrian. She competed in two events at the 1988 Summer Olympics.

References

1945 births
Living people
Swedish female equestrians
Swedish dressage riders
Olympic equestrians of Sweden
Equestrians at the 1988 Summer Olympics
Sportspeople from Gothenburg